Klaus Schnellenkamp (born 1972) is a German Chilean author. His book, Geboren im Schatten der Angst; Ich überlebte die Colonia Dignidad. (Born in the shadow of fear; I survived Colonia Dignidad), details his escape and life during the Military dictatorship of Chile.

Background
Schnellenkamp was born in Colonia Dignidad, Chile. His parents, Kurt Schnellenkamp Nelaimischkies (1927 – 2017), and Elisabeth Witthahn Krüger (1936 – 2009), were co-founders of Colonia Dignidad. In 1961, they followed the leader Paul Schäfer to Chile in order to establish and grow the colony.

1972 births
Living people
Chilean male writers
Chilean businesspeople
Chilean autobiographers
Chilean people of German descent
Colonia Dignidad
People from Maule Region